The 1940 Spring Hill Badgers football team was an American football team that represented Spring Hill College as a member of the Dixie Conference during the 1940 college football season. In their second year under head coach Andrew Edington, the team compiled a 3–5 record.

Schedule

References

Spring Hill
Spring Hill Badgers football seasons
Spring Hill Badgers football